Douglas Urbanski is an American film producer and occasional film actor. He is a twice Oscar-nominated, Golden Globe Nominated and BAFTA-winning motion picture producer.

Life and career
Urbanski was born in Somerville, New Jersey.

In addition to his Academy Award winning films Darkest Hour and Mank, along with his other films, Tinker Tailor Soldier Spy, The Contender, and Nil By Mouth, his films have received 21 Academy Award nominations, 10 Golden Globe nominations, and 33 BAFTA nominations.

Urbanski's film producing credits include The Contender, which received two Academy Award nominations and starred Gary Oldman, Jeff Bridges, Joan Allen, Christian Slater, and Sam Elliott.

In 1997, Urbanski received his first British Academy Award for Outstanding British Film of The Year for Nil By Mouth, written and directed by Gary Oldman, and for which Oldman received the Best Original Screenplay British Academy Award. The film received a total of four nominations for the 1997 BAFTAs. For 1997's Cannes Film Festival, Nil By Mouth was selected to inaugurate the Main Competition and received the 1997 Cannes Film Festival Award for actress Kathy Burke. In 1998 the film received six nominations for the British Independent Film Awards, and won three awards.

During the 1980s, Urbanski and/or his companies were among the most active theatrical producers on Broadway and in London.

In 2010, as an actor he was featured in David Fincher and Aaron Sorkin's Academy Award winning motion picture The Social Network, playing the role of Larry Summers, for which he received personal acclaim and shared the Hollywood Ensemble Acting Award from the Hollywood Film Festival, and also the Ensemble Acting Award from the Palm Springs International Film Festival, shared with Jesse Eisenberg, Andrew Garfield, and Justin Timberlake.

In 2010/11, he executive produced the film version of John le Carré's Tinker Tailor Soldier Spy, which stars Gary Oldman as master spy George Smiley, and also features Colin Firth, Tom Hardy, Benedict Cumberbatch, John Hurt and Kathy Burke, and was directed by Tomas Alfredson. Tinker, Tailor, Soldier, Spy received eleven 2012 British Academy Award nominations, including Best Picture, Best Actor, and Best Director; the film also received three Oscar nominations for the 2012 Academy Awards. In 2012, Tinker became the second of his films to win the British Academy Award for Outstanding British Film of the Year.

Urbanski was executive producer of the film Criminal, released in late 2015. It was directed by Ariel Vromen and stars Kevin Costner, Gary Oldman, and Tommy Lee Jones. In 2016 Urbanski was executive producer of The Hitman's Bodyguard, which stars Samuel L. Jackson and Ryan Reynolds, as well as Hunter Killer, which stars Gerard Butler.

Urbanski produced Darkest Hour (2017), which stars Gary Oldman as Winston Churchill, and was written by Anthony McCarten and directed by Joe Wright. Oldman won the Oscar for Best Actor for his portrayal of Churchill and thanked Urbanski during his speech. The film received six Academy Award nominations, including Best Picture and won two: Best Actor, and Best Makeup for Kazu Tsuji, who also thanked Urbanski in his speech. The film had a total of 72 major nominations, and won 23. For his work on the film, Urbanski received an Academy Award Nomination.

In 2018, he executive produced Steven Soderbergh's The Laundromat, which stars Gary Oldman and Meryl Streep. The 2018 Cannes Film Festival invited Urbanski and Oldman to host a sold-out public conversation as a highlight of the festival, entitled "In Conversation With".

In 2019, Urbanski executive produced Nicholas Jarecki's Crisis, which stars Gary Oldman and Armie Hammer.

Also in 2019–20, he produced David Fincher's Mank, about Citizen Kane screenwriter Herman J. Mankiewicz, which stars Oldman in the title role. Mank had a limited theatrical release on November 13, 2020, and began streaming on Netflix on December 4. The film received positive reviews from critics, who praised Fincher's direction, as well as the acting (particularly Oldman and Seyfried), cinematography, production values, and musical score. The film earned a leading-ten nominations at the 93rd Academy Awards, including Best Picture, Best Actor for Oldman and Best Supporting Actress for Seyfried, and won for Best Production Design and Best Cinematography. It also received a leading-six nominations at the 78th Golden Globe Awards, including Best Motion Picture – Drama.[5] The American Film Institute awarded Mank as one of the top 10 movies of the year. Urbanski received an Academy Award nomination for Mank as producer of a Best Picture nominee, and was also nominated by the Producers Guild of America for The Darryl F. Zanuck Award for Outstanding Producer of Theatrical Motion Pictures.

He is currently executive producer on the Apple TV+ series, Slow Horses, based upon the acclaimed spy novels of Mick Herron, and also starring Oldman.

Personal life 
Urbanski is married to television producer Diane Wilk (The Nanny) and they live in Beverly Hills in a home once lived in by Olivia de Havilland, John Huston, Laurence Olivier, Vivien Leigh, and Dorothy Parker; and also in Palm Springs, in White Gables, the old Joseph Cotten estate. He is Catholic.

References

External links
Profile at Douglas Management Group

Film producers from New Jersey
Living people
Male actors from Somerville, New Jersey
American people of Polish descent
Year of birth missing (living people)